Nuno Felipe Carvalho Teixeira (born 9 January 1987 in Amarante), known as Carvalho, is a Portuguese former footballer who played as a forward.

External links

1987 births
Living people
People from Amarante, Portugal
Sportspeople from Porto District
Portuguese footballers
Association football forwards
Segunda División players
Tercera División players
Divisiones Regionales de Fútbol players
UE Lleida players
CF Balaguer footballers
FC Barcelona C players
CF Pobla de Mafumet footballers
UE Tàrrega players
FC Andorra players
Portuguese expatriate footballers
Expatriate footballers in Spain
Expatriate footballers in Andorra
Portuguese expatriate sportspeople in Spain
Portuguese expatriate sportspeople in Andorra